Drew. R. McCoy is an American historian and specialist in American political and intellectual history. McCoy was educated at Cornell University (A.B. 1971) and the University of Virginia (M.A. 1973, Ph.D. 1976). He has taught American history at the University of Texas at Austin, Harvard University, and, most recently, Clark University, where he is currently the Jacob and Frances Hiatt Professor of History.  His focus is on early American history from the colonial era through the Civil War era of the mid-nineteenth century. His two books cover a general study of political economy in Revolutionary and Early National America, and a partial biography of James Madison that, by focusing on his retirement, explores the transmission of republican values across generations in nineteenth-century America.  He was awarded the John H. Dunning Prize by the American Historical Association in 1989, and the New England Historical Association Book Award.

Publications 
 "Republicanism and American Foreign Policy: James Madison and the Political Economy of Commercial Discrimination, 1789 to 1794." William and Mary Quarterly (1974): 633-646 online.
 "The Virginia Port Bill of 1784." Virginia Magazine of History and Biography 83.3 (1975): 288-303 online.
 "Benjamin Franklin's vision of a republican political economy for America." The William and Mary Quarterly (1978): 605-628 online.
 "Jefferson and Madison on Malthus: population growth in Jeffersonian political economy." Virginia magazine of history and biography 88.3 (1980): 259-276 online. 
 . "Madison's America: Polity, Economy, and Society." Quarterly Journal of the Library of Congress 37#2 (1980) pp 259–64. online .

References

21st-century American historians
21st-century American male writers
Clark University faculty
Cornell University alumni
University of Virginia alumni
Living people
Year of birth missing (living people)
American male non-fiction writers